Oklahoma is a state located in the Southern United States. According to the 2020 United States census, Oklahoma is the 28th most populous state with  inhabitants but the 19th largest by land area spanning  of land. Oklahoma is divided into 77 counties and contains 597 municipalities consisting of cities and towns.

In Oklahoma, cities are all those communities which are 1,000 or more in population and are incorporated as cities. Towns are limited to town board type of municipal government. Cities may choose among aldermanic, mayoral, council-manager, and home-rule charter types of government. Cities may also petition to incorporate as towns.

Cities and towns over 5,000 by population

See also
List of unincorporated communities in Oklahoma
List of census-designated places in Oklahoma
List of ghost towns in Oklahoma

References

Oklahoma
Cities